Nanostrain is an EU-funded project to characterise piezoelectric materials for future fast digital switch designs.

The switching may only need a much lower voltage and be faster with lower power consumption than CMOS.

References

External links
Project newsletter 2 - p6 explains concept

European Union and science and technology
Research projects